Otto Dill (4 June 1884 – 6 July 1957) was a German painter. His work was part of the art competitions at the 1928 Summer Olympics and the 1932 Summer Olympics.

References

1884 births
1957 deaths
20th-century German painters
20th-century German male artists
German male painters
Olympic competitors in art competitions
People from Neustadt an der Weinstraße